Alex Drury (born 1981), known professionally as Alex Metric, is a British musician, DJ and producer. At the 61st Annual Grammy Awards, he won a Grammy Award for Best Dance Recording for producing the Silk City and Dua Lipa song "Electricity".

Biography
Alex Metric has released numerous EPs as a solo artist, and singles as a member of Metroplane and Kuu. He has remixed artists such as Daft Punk, N.E.R.D.,  Foals, La Roux,  Phoenix, Gorillaz  Depeche Mode and Bloc Party as well as working as a producer for acts such as  Silk City, Dua Lipa, Avicii, Snow Patrol,  Muse, Charli XCX, The Infadels and Adam Freeland.

Discography

Singles and EPs
 Whatshewants - EP (2007)
 Deadly On a Mission - EP (2008)
 In Your Machine - EP (2008)
 The Head Straight - EP (2009)
 It Starts - EP (2009)
 It Starts (Remixes) - EP (2009)
 "Open Your Eyes" - Single (2011)
 Open Your Eyes (Remixes & Productions) - Compilation album (2011)
 End of the World - EP (2011)
 Ammunition EP (2012)
 Ammunition Pt. 2 EP (2012)
 Ammunition Pt. 3 EP (2013)
 "Safe With You" (with Jacques Lu Cont featuring Malin) - Single (2013)
 Hope EP (2014)
 "Heart Weighs a Ton" (featuring Stefan Storm) - Single (2014)
 Heart Weighs a Ton Remixes EP (2014)
 Ammunition Pt. 4 EP (2015)
 Ammunition Pt. 4 Remixes EP (2016)
 "Freeek" (featuring Confessionals) - Single (2017)
 "Word Of Mouth" (As Metroplane) - Single (2017)
 "Otic"  (With Ten Ven) -  Single (2018)
"Be Where I Am" (As Metroplane) - Single (2019)
"Upswing (with Amtrac) - Single (2020)
"How Could I Ever" (As Kuu with Riton) - Single (2020)
"We'll Always Have This Dance - Single (2020)
"Qubit" (with Ten Ven) - Single (2020)

Remixes
 Hard Fi - "Suburban Knights"
 Autokratz - "Stay The Same"
 Splittr - "All Alone"
 Black Daniel - "Gimme What You Got"
 Locarnos - "Make Up Your Mind"
 Alphabeat - "Boyfriend"
 Reverend & The Makers - "Silence is Talking"
 Infadels - "Free Things for Poor People"
 Freeland - "Under Control"
 Primary 1 - "Ho Lord" (Unreleased)
 The Enemy - "Sing When You're In Love" (Promo Only)
 Ladyhawke - "Paris Is Burning"
 Phoenix - "Lisztomania"
 Bloc Party - "One More Chance"
 U2 - "Crazy" (Unreleased Remix)
 Kenneth Bager - "I Can't Wait"
 Fenech-Soler - "Lies"
 La Roux - "Quicksand"
 Gorillaz - "Stylo"
 Ellie Goulding - "Salt Skin"
 Maximum Balloon - "Groove Me"
 NERD - "Hypnotize U"
 Depeche Mode - "Personal Jesus"
 Niki and The Dove - "Mother Protect"
 Sade - "Love Is Found" (Promo only)
 The Whip - "Secret Weapon"
 Miike Snow - "Devil's Work"
 The Presets - "Youth In Trouble"
 Ellie Goulding - "Anything Could Happen"
 St. Lucia - "September"
 Two Door Cinema Club - "Sun"
 Scissor Sisters - "Inevitable" (unreleased) 
 Willy Moon - "Get Up" (Promo only)
 Yeah Yeah Yeahs- "Despair" (unreleased)
 Foals - "Bad Habit"
 Empire of the Sun- "DNA" 
 Madeon - "You're On (ft. Kyan)"
 All Tvvins - "Darkest Ocean"
 Saint Raymond - "Young Blood" (promo only)
 Everything Everything-"Distant Past"
 Foals - "Mountain At My Gates"
 Dusky Grey - "Told Me"
 Just Kiddin - "Fall for You"
 Bad Sounds - Evil Powers 
 Friendly Fires - "Love Like Waves"
 Mel - Santiago 
 Silk City- "Electricity" 
 Parcels-"Lightenup"
 Big Wild-"City of Sound"
 Foals-"Sunday" (Release TBD)
Roosevelt - Sign
Foals - Wash Off (As Kuu)
Victor Le Masne - Fortune Cookie
Mixes Under the "Metroplane" Alias

 Becky Hill- "Unpredictable" 
 Anais-"Lost My Faith"

Bootlegs
 The Rapture - The Devil (Alex Metric Bootleg)
 Metric - Monster Hospital (Alex Metric Bootleg)
 Cassius - Sound of Violence (Alex Metric Re-Edit)
 Beastie Boys - Sabotage (Alex Metric Re-Edit)
 Blur - Song 2 (Alex Metric Festival Edit)
 Frank Ocean - White Ferrari (Alex Metric Re-Edit)

Songwriting and production credits

References

External links

British electronic musicians
British radio presenters
English record producers
British dance musicians
British house musicians
English house musicians
DJs from London
Remixers
Living people
1984 births
Owsla artists
Grammy Award winners for dance and electronic music